The 2014 Elon Phoenix football team represented Elon University in the 2014 NCAA Division I FCS football season. They were led by-first year head coach Rich Skrosky and played their home games at Rhodes Stadium. They were first-year members of the Colonial Athletic Association. They finished the season 1–11, 0–8 in CAA play to finish in last place.

Schedule

Schedule source:

Game summaries

at Duke

North Carolina A&T

Charlotte

at Coastal Carolina

New Hampshire

at Delaware

Stony Brook

Richmond

at Towson

at William & Mary

Maine

at James Madison

References

Elon
Elon Phoenix football seasons
Elon Phoenix football